Lake Bixhoma, is a public reservoir owned and operated by the city of Bixby, Oklahoma. It is located on Bixhoma Lake Road about 7 miles southeast of Bixby, and 2.2 miles south of U.S. 64 and the community of Leonard, Oklahoma.

Recreation and amenities

Fishing is allowed from the bank or by boat (with a low-wake zone enforced over the entire lake), but swimming is prohibited. Kayaking and stand-up paddleboarding are popular activities. Daily fishing or boating permits are required for all persons intending to engage in those activities on the lake, regardless of age. Permits are issued by the city of Bixby at the City Hall, and as of 2017 were $5.00 per day or $15.00 per year, with no charge for persons ages 65 years old or over and for children age 11 years old and under. Fishing is regulated with a daily bag limit of five fish applied to largemouth or spotted bass, and catfish, in addition to state bag limits on all other species including crappie and panfish. Amenities at the lake include two boat ramps, floating fishing docks, and picnic areas with charcoal grills and fire pits.  The area around Lake Bixhoma consists of undeveloped, heavily forested and rocky hills, and when water is flowing from the reservoir outlet (dependent upon rainfall and resultant lake level) the stream below the lake contains a series of small waterfalls accessible by a trail.  Access to the lake is open all days from 6:00am – 10:00pm.

References

External links
 City of Bixby Parks 
 OK Tourism

Bixhoma